Different Days is the 13th studio album by British alternative rock band The Charlatans, released on 26 May 2017.

The album features guest appearances from Paul Weller (who co-wrote "Spinning Out"), Gillian Gilbert, Stephen Morris, Johnny Marr, Peter Salisbury (The Verve), Donald Johnson (A Certain Ratio), Ian Rankin, and Sharon Horgan.

Release
On 20 March 2017, Different Days was announced for release. "Plastic Machinery" was made available for streaming on 4 April. A music video was released for the track on 24 April; directed by Ewen Spencer, the clip was filmed in Barcelona, Spain. A remix of the song was done by Sleaford Mods and was made available for streaming on 25 May. Different Days was released on 26 May. On the same day, "Plastic Machinery" was released as a single. To promote the album's release, the band did two acoustic performances. The album was released in Japan through Hostess Entertainment on 2 June and included remixes of "Plastic Machinery" as bonus tracks. "Over Again" was released as a single on 13 October. In November and December, the group went on a headlining UK tour. On 8 December, a music video was released for "Over Again", directed by Ashley Shakibai. An EP, Totally Eclipsing, was released alongside a two-CD edition of the album on 8 June 2018. In September and October, the group went on a headlining North American tour. The album cover photo was taken in an unknown city.

Reception

The album was described by David Barnett in The Independent as "possibly their most ambitious project yet". Dave Simpson, for The Guardian, gave it four stars and called it "their best album in 20 years". AllMusic writer Stephen Thomas Erlewine gave it three and a half stars, stating that the band "embrace the elastic possibilities of new avenues here, and the results are rewarding". Pitchfork's Robert Ham gave it 6.0 out of 10, calling it "good but not great". Richard Folland, for PopMatters, also gave it 6 out of 10, describing it as Modern Nature Part 2.

Track listing

Personnel
The Charlatans
Tim Burgess – vocals
Martin Blunt – bass guitar
Mark Collins – guitar
Tony Rogers – keyboards

Additional musicians
Paul Weller – piano, percussion, vocals
Gillian Gilbert – keyboards
Stephen Morris – drums, programming
Johnny Marr – guitar
Anton Newcombe – guitar, percussion, keyboards
Peter Salisbury – drums
Ben Gordelier – drums
Donald Johnson – percussion
Derick Johnson – bass
Ian Rankin – spoken word
Kurt Wagner – spoken word
Sharon Horgan – backing vocals
Nik Void – backing vocals
Shuri Endo – voice

References

2017 albums
BMG Rights Management albums
The Charlatans (English band) albums